The Orinoco sword-nosed bat (Lonchorhina orinocensis) is a species of bat in the family Phyllostomidae. It is found in Colombia and Venezuela.

References

Lonchorhina
Mammals of Colombia
Mammals of Venezuela
Mammals described in 1971
Taxonomy articles created by Polbot